Xinghua is a town of Fengkai County in western Guangdong province, China, located  east of the county seat. , it has one residential community and 11 villages under its administration.

See also
List of township-level divisions of Guangdong

References

Towns in Guangdong
Zhaoqing